Five-time defending champion Dylan Alcott defeated Andy Lapthorne in the final, 6–0, 6–4 to win the quad singles wheelchair tennis title at the 2020 Australian Open.

Seeds

Draw

Final

Round robin

References

External links
 Drawsheet on ausopen.com

Wheelchair Quad Singles
2020 Quad Singles